KWTW (88.5 FM) is a radio station broadcasting a Christian Contemporary & Talk format, licensed to Bishop, California, United States. KWTW is known as The Living Proof Radio Network, which is a ministry of Calvary Chapel in Bishop. The station is currently owned by Westside Christian Fellowship A.V. The Living Proof Radio Network, in addition to KWTW 88.5 Bishop, is also broadcast on KWTD 91.9 FM in Ridgecrest, California.

External links
Living Proof Broadcasting

Bishop, California
WTW
Calvary Chapel Association
2002 establishments in California
Radio stations established in 2002